The Sane Day is the second studio album by Swedish progressive rock band Beardfish.

Track listing
All songs written by Rikard Sjöblom.

Disc one

Disc two

Personnel
Production and performance credits are adapted from the album liner notes.

Beardfish
 Rikard Sjöblom – lead vocals, left speaker guitar, organ, keys, synthesizers, percussives
 David Zackrisson – right speaker guitar, synthesizers, vocals, live sfx
 Robert Hansen – bass, guitar, vocals
 Magnus Östgren – drums

Special guests
 Rasmus Diamant – flute in “Sun is the Devil”
 Christer Jäderlung – vocals in “The Reason of Constructing and/or Building a Pyramid”
 Lisa Marklund – vocals in “The Reason of Constructing and/or Building a Pyramid”

Production
 William Blackmon - engineering and mixing
 Rikard Sjöblom - engineering and mixing
 Robert Hansen - mixing
 Björn Arnell - engineering
 C. Romanikov - mastering
 David Zackrisson - layout
 Hanna Lindqvist - fishdrawing

References

2005 albums
Progressive rock albums by Swedish artists